RoundMe is a virtual tour application which allows users to create, upload and share 360 degree panoramic photos and multimedia content of real spaces, that users could visit virtually using Google Cardboard or any VR headsets. The app is available on the web, iOS and Android. Roundme was positioned as one of the Best New Apps in the iTunes App Store in 58 countries in 2015. Roundme raised a $3 million round led by April Capital in 2015, reportedly by TechCrunch.  The company is also hosting spaces for brands including National Library of Belarus and American Airlines.

History 
RoundMe was founded in June 2012 by Konstantin Andreev. It was officially released on June 17, 2014. It is headquartered in Los Angeles, California. Talking to TechCrunch, Konstantin Andreev, CEO said that his goal was to create the best virtual tour experience in the panoramic photography marketplace.

See also
 Giphy
 Instagram
 Flickr
 Vine
 Bazaart

References

External links
 

IOS software
Android (operating system) software
Companies based in Los Angeles
Internet properties established in 2014
Photo software
Mobile software
2014 software
2015 software
Social networking services